Digitalis parviflora, the small-flowered foxglove, is a species of flowering plant in the plantain family Plantaginaceae. It is endemic to northern and central Spain. It grows at (rarely 200-) 500-2000 metres in altitude.

It was first described as a species by Nikolaus Joseph von Jacquin in the first half of the 1770s. The Latin specific epithet parviflora means "with small flowers".

Description
Digitalis parviflora is a short-lived herbaceous perennial or biennial. Spires of tubular rust-red flowers rise from downy rosettes of leaves in late spring and early summer.

Uses
It is cultivated as an ornamental, preferring a semi-shaded position with damp soil. The species and the cultivar 'Milk Chocolate'  have won the Royal Horticultural Society's Award of Garden Merit.

References

parviflora